La Grande Borne is a housing estate, in the Essonne département on the southern outskirts of Paris, France. The estate is located in both the communes of Grigny and Viry-Châtillon. The architect Émile Aillaud designed this housing estate.

Notable residents
 Amedy Coulibaly, Islamist main suspect for the Montrouge shooting, and hostage-taker and gunman in the Porte de Vincennes hostage crisis

 Patrice Quarteron, born in 1979,a French super heavyweight kickboxer, has lived in this neighbourhood. He is two time French and European Muay Thai champion and current IKF Muay Thai Super Heavyweight World champion

References

External links 
 

Neighbourhoods in France
Buildings and structures in Essonne